Krit Sripoomseth (born August 20, 1979) is a Thai model and actor. He graduated from Assumption University. Starting off a career as a DJ at age 23, he later became best known for his moderator role in Fan Pan Tae for 4 years from 2012 to 2015 and Khon Uad Phee, the television programmes of Workpoint Entertainment.

Works

Dramatic programming appearances
 Khu Khon La Khua (2001)
 Saw Chai Hua Chai Chicago
 Luk Phu Chai
 Rak Ham Promote
 Phi Nai Kam
 Krong Phet

Film appearances
 Buppha Ratree (2003)
 Buppha Ratree 2 (2005)
 Chai Lai (2006)
 My Valentine (2010)

Radio
 DJ RVS (2002)
 DJ Bangkok Radio (2003)
 DJ 2004 (2004)

Television programming appearances
 Five Live 
 Gane Glai Tua
 Teen Center
 It's mystery
 Khon Uad Phee (2010–present)
 Thailand's Got Talent (2011–2012)
 Fan Pan Tae (2012–2015)
 Luang Lab Tab Taek Show (2012)
 Thursday Surprise (2012–2013)
 The Noise Thailand (2013–2014)
 The Band Thailand (2013)
 The X Factor Thailand (2017)

Music video appearances
 Khon Bab Chan (1995)
 Rak... Mai Rak (1998)
 Thoe Kong Mai Ru (1998)
 Beautiful Boy (2004)

References

External links
 
 
 

1979 births
Living people
Krit Sripoomseth
Krit Sripoomseth
Krit Sripoomseth
Krit Sripoomseth
Krit Sripoomseth
Krit Sripoomseth